Nathalie Alonso Casale (born 1970 in Paris, France) is a film actress, film editor and film director who won the 1992 Golden Calf for Best Short Film.

Partial filmography 
Sources
Het is een schone dag geweest (1994) - Film editor
Krima/Kerime (1995) -  Film editor
HKG (1999)  - Film editor
Man looks at Woman, Woman looks at Man (2000) - Film director, editor, and cast member.
Nothing Personal (2009 film) - Film editor
Code Blue (2011)

References

External links 

1970 births
Living people
Dutch actresses
Dutch film directors
Dutch film editors

French emigrants to the Netherlands

Film people from Paris
French women film editors